P-mode can refer to:
 protected mode, an operation mode of x86 CPUs
 promiscuous mode, in computer networking
 pressure mode pulsation in asteroseismology